Events from the year 2017 in the British Virgin Islands.

Incumbents
Governor: 
 until 8 August: John Duncan 
 8 August - 12 August: Robert Mathavious (acting)
 12 August - 22 August: Rosalie Adams (acting)
 starting 22 August: Augustus Jaspert
Premier: Orlando Smith

Events

January

 9 January 2017 - Bishop John Cline resigns from the BVI Health Services Authority after criticising the Government.
 11 January 2017 - Social Security Board signs a contract to build 43 homes as part of a social housing project, the Territory's first.
 23 January 2017 
 Former US President Barack Obama visits the British Virgin Islands.
 BVI Finance appoints a new board of director from the private sector, transitioning from a publicly run body.

February

 6 February 2017 - Andrew Fahie replaces Julian Fraser as leader of the opposition Virgin Islands Party.

 8 February 2017 - Earl ‘Bob’ Hodge and Robert ‘Tico’ Harrigan are remanded into custody in relation to a long-standing extradition request from the United States.

March
 3 March 2017 - Minister of Health, Ronnie Skelton, calls for the decriminalisation of marijuana.

April
 1 April 2017 - retirement age is increased from 60 to 65.
 25 April 2017 - UNICEF publishes a controversial report on the state of the British Virgin Islands.

May
 3 May 2017 - new British Virgin Islands Electricity Corporation power plant comes online.
 8 May 2017 - the Territory records its fifth murder, the highest total since 2008 and second highest ever.

July
 1 July 2017 - registers of beneficial ownership are introduced for British Virgin Islands companies.
 18 July 2017 - BVI Airways announced it was laying off all staff as it had exhausted its funds, despite having received a $7 million Government subsidy.  This followed tit-for-tat accusations between the Government and the airline.

August

 8 August 2017 - Emancipation Festival celebrations are cancelled after flooding damage caused by torrential rains, the first cancellation due to weather in decades.
 17 August 2017 - contrary to expectations, the Financial Services Commission announces an increase in incorporation rates since the introduction of beneficial ownership registration.
 22 August 2017 - Augustus "Gus" Jaspert is sworn in as the new Governor of the Virgin Islands.

September

 6 September 2017 - Hurricane Irma strikes the British Virgin Islands directly causing widespread damage and 4 deaths.
 7 September 2017 - Governor declares state of emergency under the Constitution of the British Virgin Islands, the first time this has ever happened.
 20 September 2017 - Hurricane Maria strikes the British Virgin Islands obliquely, causing modest damage.  Damage caused by the Hurricane to nearby Puerto Rico affects recovery efforts following Hurricane Irma.
 27 September 2017 - A number of high-risk inmates are transferred from Tortola to Bordelais Correctional Facility in St Lucia because of the damaged state of the Balsam Ghut prison.

November

 14 November 2017 - At the third attempt the US government secures a ruling to extradite Earl 'Bob' Hodge and Roberto 'Tico' Harrigan  to the US to face drugs charges.  The initial extradition request was made in 2012.
 22 November 2017 - a double homicide brings the country's tally of murders for the year to 10, the highest total ever in a single calendar year.

December

 19 December 2017 - The Social Security board acquires a 33% shareholding in National Bank of the Virgin Islands.  The bank was formerly wholly owned by the Government of the Virgin Islands.

Deaths
 20 December - Omar Hodge, politician.

Footnotes

 
2010s in the British Virgin Islands
British Virgin Islands